The mountain mullet (Dajaus monticola) is a freshwater fish of the family Mugilidae.  It can be found in North and South America, from North Carolina, Florida, Louisiana and Texas in the United States to Colombia and Venezuela, including the West Indies in the Antilles. It is the only species in the monotypic genus Dajaus.

Conservation
It is considered threatened in Costa Rica. It is found from sea level up to 650m in altitude in the rivers of the Maquenque National Wildlife Refuge. It is common in the Toro Negro State Forest in central Puerto Rico.

References

Mugilidae
Fish described in 1834